was a Japanese politician who served in the House of Representatives from 1937 to 1946. He was the father of former Foreign Minister Shintaro Abe and the grandfather of former Prime Minister Shinzō Abe.

Life 
Abe was born on 29 April 1894, in Heki (present-day Nagato), Yamaguchi Prefecture, the eldest son of Abe Hyōsuke and his wife Tame. The Abe family was a prominent family of landowners and sake and soy sauce brewers in Heki who had served as nanushi (village heads) in the Edo period. His father was from the Mukunoki family, a prominent family in Ōtsu, who was adopted into his wife's family upon marriage. Both his parents died by the time he was four, after which he was raised by his aunt Yoshi. Abe graduated from Tokyo Imperial University, the predecessor of the University of Tokyo.

Abe stood as a Seiyūkai Party candidate in the February 1928 general election but lost; he was appointed village mayor of Heki in 1933 and later served in the Yamaguchi prefectural assembly. He was elected to the House of Representatives as an independent candidate in the February 1937 general election. He earned the nickname "New Shōin" or "Shōwa Shōin" in honor of the earlier leader from Yamaguchi, Yoshida Shōin.

In the 1942 general election, he ran on a platform opposing the militarist government under Hideki Tojo, which had by this time taken away most powers from the Diet. The Tojo cabinet had attempted to block antiwar candidates from running through a registration system, notwithstanding which Abe won a Diet seat, which he used for an attempt to oust Tojo and end World War II. Abe was assisted in this effort by Takeo Miki, who became prime minister after the war.

Abe died of a heart attack in January 1946 while preparing to run in the first post-war general election.

References

1894 births
1946 deaths
Members of the House of Representatives (Empire of Japan)
Politicians from Yamaguchi Prefecture
University of Tokyo alumni